Gorshkov (masculine) or Gorshkova (feminine) is a Russian (Slavic) surname. Notable people with the surname include:

Aleksandr Gorshkov (disambiguation), multiple people
Alexei Gorshkov (born 1967), Russian ice dancing coach
Anastasia Gorshkova (born 1987), Russian ice dancer, daughter of Alexei
Anatoliy Gorshkov (born 1958), Ukrainian racewalker
Anna Gorshkova  (born 1983), Russian actress
Dmitry Gorshkov (born 1967), Russian water polo player
Gordei Gorshkov (born 1993), Russian figure skater
Kristina Gorshkova (born 1989), Russian ice dancer
Nadezhda Gorshkova (born 1956), Russian pair skater
Nastia Gorshkova (born 1986), Russian fashion model
Sergey Gorshkov (1910–1988), Soviet naval officer, admiral
Sergey Gorshkov (general) (1902–1993), Soviet general and cavalryman
Vasiliy Gorshkov (born 1977), Russian pole vaulter

See also
Soviet aircraft carrier Admiral Gorshkov
Admiral Gorshkov-class frigate
Russian frigate Admiral Gorshkov, the lead ship of this class
Gorshkovo

Russian-language surnames